Mary Eleanor Power is an ecology professor in the Department of Integrative Biology at the University of California, Berkeley. Power is a member of the U.S. National Academy of Sciences, the American Academy of Arts and Sciences, and the California Academy of Sciences. She holds an honorary doctorate from Umeå University, Sweden, and is a recipient of the G. Evelyn Hutchinson Award of the Association for the Sciences of Limnology and Oceanography (formerly known as the American Society of Limnology and Oceanography (2005)), and the Kempe Award for Distinguished Ecologists (2004).
 
Power is a past president of the Ecological Society of America (2009–10) and the American Society of Naturalists (2005-2006).

Power and her work are featured prominently in the documentary film, The Serengeti Rules, which was released in 2018.

Biography
Power earned her Ph.D in Zoology from the University of Washington in 1981 and has been professor in the Department of Integrative Biology at the University of California Berkeley since 1987. She has also been a faculty manager of the Angelo Coast Range Reserve in Mendocino County since 1989.

Professional work
Power's research on river food web ecology, community and landscape ecology has influenced theory on the importance of food webs in ecosystem functioning. Her long-term research has examined how species influence changes in food webs, how energy flows across ecosystems, and how species interactions vary in different environmental regimes, with relevance to Biogeomorphology and food web alterations.

Power's study of armored catfish was part of the early research on ideal free distribution in the wild. Power has worked primarily on food web, landscape and community ecology in the Eel River of California.

Major publications

Power, M.E., D. Tilman, J. A. Estes, B.A. Menge, W.J. Bond, L.S. Mills, G. Daily, J.C. Castilla, J. Lubchenco, and R.T. Paine. 1996. Challenges in the quest for keystones. BioScience 46: 609-620.
Power, M. E. 1992. Top-down and bottom-up forces in food webs: do plants have primacy? Ecology 73: 733-746. 
Power, M. E. 1990. Effects of fish in river food webs. Science 250: 811-814.

References

External links
  Berkeley.edu:  Mary Eleanor Power
  NAS.org: Mary Eleanor Power

American ecologists
1949 births
Living people
American women biologists
Women ecologists
People associated with the California Academy of Sciences
University of California, Berkeley faculty
University of Washington College of Arts and Sciences alumni
Scientists from California
20th-century American women scientists
21st-century American women scientists
20th-century American scientists
21st-century American scientists
Fellows of the Ecological Society of America
Members of the United States National Academy of Sciences